The following is a list of deputy speakers of the People's Consultative Assembly in Indonesia.

See also 
 People's Consultative Assembly
 List of speakers of the People's Consultative Assembly

Notes

References 

Lists of political office-holders in Indonesia
Politics of Indonesia
Government of Indonesia
Indonesia